The Oxymoron is a student satirical magazine published anonymously by and for students of Oxford University. It takes the form of a spoof newspaper, similar to The Onion, though with a focus on events relevant to the life of an Oxford student. The magazine takes its name from the concept of an oxymoron, as well as being a reference to the word Oxon, used to identify an Oxford degree. It is published termly.

History
The magazine was founded in Michaelmas term of 2007 by Matt Pickles, David Murgia and John Citron, three undergraduate students from The Queen's College, and first published on November 17. Each issue from the second has been 8 pages in length; the first contained 4 pages. These are split between news satire, and spoof features. In contrast with the majority of student publications, it is printed without the names of the writers or editors, and these are not normally made public. Many previous Oxymoron editors have gone on to work as professional journalists and comedy writers.

The Oxymoron has the largest Facebook group of any Oxford magazine or newspaper. Despite this popularity, the magazine has at times struggled to find funding - it carries few advertisements and seeks alternative funding through a combination of JCR subscriptions and charity comedy nights by acts such as the Oxford Revue.

Awards

See also
 List of satirical magazines
 List of satirical news websites
 List of satirical television news programs

References

External links
 

2007 establishments in England
Magazines established in 2007
Publications associated with the University of Oxford
Student magazines published in the United Kingdom
Mass media in Oxford
Satirical magazines published in the United Kingdom
College humor magazines